Franklin Fowler, (January 16, 1842January 25, 1902) was a 19th-century American Boston maritime pilot. He went with his father to California to become a pilot. He returned to Boston and became one of the oldest and best known pilots in the Boston service, serving for twenty-five years. He was captain of the pilot boat Florence. In 1888, he received an award from the Massachusetts Humane Society for rescuing the crew from the barque Hattie L. Curtis.

Early life

Captain Franklin "Frank" Fowler was born in Charlestown, Massachusetts, on January 16, 1842. He is the son of Captain James Lawrence Fowler (1799 – 1885), of Main, and Louisa Jane Lincoln. His uncle, William C. Fowler was a well known Boston pilot. Fowler graduated from the John Eliot School in the North End. He was married to Beatrice B. Gurney and had three children. They divorced in October 1895 with a trial that attracted a lot of attention.

In 1859, at age 17, Fowler went to San Francisco, California, on the pilot boat Dancing Feather, with his father during the gold rush fever. He went into the California pilot service at this time. He later proceeded to the coast of Mexico, where he searched for the three-masted steamship SS Yankee Blade that sank and was able to raise four boxes of treasure from the sunken vessel, which amounted to $70,000.

Career

In 1869, Fowler returned to Boston after his trip out west with his father and joined the Boston pilot service. He served twenty-five years on the pilot boats Hesper, Minvera, Florence, and Liberty. The Florence, was built in 1867 from a model by Dennison J. Lawlor for William C. Fowler. The vessel had a reputation for being fast under sail and had a long career in the Boston service.

The Massachusetts Humane Society awarded Fowler and George W. Lawler a bronze medal, while severing on the Hesper, for the rescue of four of the crew from the Barque Hattie L. Curtis on September 26, 1888. The Curtis sank in heavy weather and the crew had taken safety on a raft before being picked up by the Hesper.

On July 17, 1895, friends of pilots Fowler and George W. Lawler were on the pilot boat Hesper, No. 5, when it went down the bay to Nantucket island for an annual excursion.

On October 8, 1896, Fowler was the pilot on the Warren Line steamship Roman. the ship was grounded on Georges Island, trying to avoid a sow's tender. The board of pilot commissioners invested the matter and found him free from any blame for the accident.

Death

Fowler died, at age 60, on January 25, 1902, in Boston, Massachusetts. Rev. E. A. Horton officiated at the funeral services and wrote a poem called "Cast off the lines!"

On April 29, 1902, Captain Franklin B. Wellock's son, Charles Henry Wellock, was delegated the duty of throwing the ashes of the late Captain Frank Fowler off the deck into Massachusetts Bay, from the Boston pilot-boat America, No. 1. Some of the notible pilots that attended the memorial were James H. Reid and Watson Shields Dolliver. The flag at the pilot headquarters at Lewis Wharf was lowered to half-staff out of respect to one of the oldest and best known pilots in the Boston service.

See also

 List of Northeastern U. S. Pilot Boats

References

Maritime pilotage
Sea captains
People from Boston
1842 births
1902 deaths